The Saint Kitts and Nevis Defence Force is the military of Saint Kitts and Nevis. It currently consists of an infantry unit (the St. Kitts Nevis Regiment) and a maritime unit (the St. Kitts Nevis Coast Guard). Both units having regular and reserve elements, all under the command Force Headquarters (FHQ, SKNDF). The current Commander of the SKNDF is Major J. Anthony Comrie. The SKNDF has an active force of 300 personnel with a corps of 150 cadets.

The commander takes orders from the Minister of National Security.

Mission 
The primary mission of the land force element is the internal security of St Kitts and Nevis, in conjunction with the local police, while the coast Guard is responsible for guarding the country's territorial waters. One of the major roles of the entire SKNDF is drug trade interception, which is often undertaken together with the local police and the Royal Navy. The SKNDF is also used in the provision of relief after natural disasters and in overseas peacekeeping roles.

History 

The SKNDF was originally formed as a volunteer unit in 1896 in response to riots in several sugar plantations. The regular defence force did not come into being however until 1967, when it was decided that a regular army was needed following public disturbances on the island of Anguilla, which was attempting to secede from its federation with Saint Kitts and Nevis, and the determination that the existing volunteer force was not adequately trained to deal with the situation.

The first Defence's manpower came from the Royal St. Christopher and Nevis Police Force's Tactical Unit and the Special Service Unit.

The forming of the regular defence force was a major policy of the ruling Labour Party, and was adamantly opposed by the opposition People's Action Movement (PAM). When the PAM came to power in 1980, they made the decision to disband the regular force, leaving only the reserve. The election of Denzil Douglas in 1995 saw the new government reform the regulars.

Regular Corps 
The regular corps of the SKNDF consists of:
'A' Company: This is the regular infantry unit of the SKNDF. It is under the command of a captain, and consists of an HQ and three rifle platoons.
Support and Services Platoon: This is the administrative and logistics element, and includes two other individual units:
The Agricultural Corps
Coast Guard: This is the marine element, and is divided into three sub-units:
CG Headquarters
Engineer Unit
Flotilla – this is responsible for the operation of the five vessels of the Coast Guard.
The Coast Guard's lone off-shore patrol vessel was donated by the United States

Equipment 
3x Daimler Ferret FV-702 4x4 Armored Reconnaissance Vehicle (ARV) 
Land Rover Defender 4x4 
Sterling MK-4 9mm SubMachine Gun (SMG) 
FN-FAL 50-00 
L-1A1 7.62mm Semi-Automatic Rifle (SAR) 
FN-MAG 7.62mm Light Machine Gun (LMG) 
L-16A-1 81mm Mortar 
M16A4 5.56mm NATO Assault Rifle 
M16A3 5.56mm NATO Assault Rifle 
M16A2 5.56mm NATO Assault Rifle 
M4A1 5.56mm NATO Carbine

Organization 
Force Headquarters
Saint Kitts and Nevis Regiment
Combat Service and Support Unit

Reserve Corps 
The reserve corps of the SKNDF consists of:
'B' Company: This is the reserve infantry unit, and mirrors 'A' Company in structure.
Coast Guard: This provides reserves for the Coast Guard.
St Kitts and Nevis Defence Force Band: The Saint Kitts and Nevis Defence Force Band founded in the early 1930s and serves as the official military band of the country. It has varied in size over the years, from a low of 15 to a high of 48. A subunit of the Band is the Corps of Drums. The band is led by a Director of Music, which is currently Captain Nigel Williams.
St Kitts and Nevis Defence Force Cadet Corps: consisting of 150 cadets (80 senior & 70 junior)

Facilities 
 Kitts and Nevis Defence Headquarters Building at Camp Springfield
 Coast Guard Base at Bird Rock
 Bath Village

See also 
 Regional Security System

References

External links 
St. Kitts and Nevis

Regiments of Caribbean nations
 
British colonial regiments
Military units and formations established in 1896
Military units and formations of British Leeward Islands in World War II